Morteza Ghiasi Cheka (born 7 April 1995) is an Iranian freestyle wrestler who currently competes at 65 kilograms. A 2021 Asian Continental Championships medalist, Ghiasi represented Iran at the 2020 Summer Olympics that were held in 2021.

Major results

References

External links 
 
 
 

Living people
People from Lorestan Province
Iranian male sport wrestlers
Asian Wrestling Championships medalists
Wrestlers at the 2020 Summer Olympics
1995 births
Olympic wrestlers of Iran
20th-century Iranian people
21st-century Iranian people
Islamic Solidarity Games competitors for Iran